The Born equation can be used for estimating the electrostatic component of Gibbs free energy of solvation of an ion. It is an electrostatic model that treats the solvent as a continuous dielectric medium (it is thus one member of a class of methods known as continuum solvation methods).

It was derived by Max Born.

where:
NA =  Avogadro constant
z = charge of ion
e = elementary charge, 1.6022 C
ε0 = permittivity of free space
r0 = effective radius of ion
εr = dielectric constant of the solvent

Derivation 

References

External links
aspects about this equation

Enthalpy
Max Born